Ben Mason (born 2 March 1977) is an English professional golfer.

Professional career
Mason turned professional in 1999 after a successful amateur career which included reaching the semifinals of The Amateur Championship in  1998. He joined the second-tier Challenge Tour in 2001 and from 2003 to 2005 he played full-time on the European Tour, where his best finish was second in the 2003 Aa St Omer Open. However he never finished within the top 120 money earners who maintain their tour rights automatically; his best Order of Merit finish was 134th in 2005. In 2006 Mason returned to playing the Challenge Tour full-time, where he recorded his first professional win in 2007 at the Open Mahou de Madrid.

Professional wins (2)

Challenge Tour wins (1)

*Note: The 2007 Open Mahou de Madrid was shortened to 54 holes due to weather.

Challenge Tour playoff record (0–1)

Other wins (1)
2014 Leeds Cup

References

External links

English male golfers
European Tour golfers
Sportspeople from Dewsbury
Sportspeople from Rotherham
1977 births
Living people